Kåre Ivar Olli (born 1 March 1959) is a Norwegian Sami Arbeiderparti politician, a member of the Sametinget since 2017. He represents Ávjovárri constituency.

He is educated as an agronomist, holds a professional certificate in the labor and professional driver professions, as well as basic courses in crafts and industrial sciences. He has worked as a driver and as per 2017 is traffic manager at Boreal Buss.

From 1995 to 2015 he was a member of the municipal council of the Labor Party in Porsanger.

See also 
 «Kåre Olli – listetopp for Arbeiderpartiet i Ávjovárri valgkrets», NRK Sapmis nettsider 14. august 2017

References

External links
 Sametinget - Kåre Olli

1959 births
Living people
People from Porsanger
Norwegian Sámi politicians
Finnmark politicians
Labour Party (Norway) politicians